Stephen Darwall (born 1946) is a contemporary moral philosopher, best known for his work developing Kantian and deontological themes.  He is Andrew Downey Orrick Professor of Philosophy at Yale University.

Education and career

A 1968 graduate of Yale University, he earned his PhD in Philosophy at the University of Pittsburgh under Kurt Baier in 1972.  He began his teaching career at the University of North Carolina, Chapel Hill in 1972, and then joined the Department of Philosophy at the University of Michigan philosophy department, where he is, since 2006, John Dewey Distinguished University Professor Emeritus.  He has been a fellow of the American Academy of Arts and Sciences since 2001. He and David Velleman are founding co-editors of Philosophers' Imprint.  He specializes in the foundations and history of ethics.

Selected works 
Impartial Reason (1983)
The British Moralists and the Internal 'Ought': 1640–1740 (1995)
Welfare and Rational Care (2002)
The Second-Person Standpoint: Morality, Respect, and Accountability (2006)

He also has written an ethics textbook:
Philosophical Ethics (1997)

References

University of Michigan faculty
Yale University faculty
20th-century American philosophers
21st-century American philosophers
Presidents of the American Philosophical Association
Living people
1946 births